Langenstein's is a grocery store in Louisiana. Regional specialities include daube glacé and crawfish pie.

History

Langenstein's was established in New Orleans in 1922 by Michael Langenstein and his two sons, George and Richard, located Uptown on Arabella Street and Metairie. The store offers groceries and prepared foods, including regional specialities, such as crawfish etouffee, seafood gumbo, and grillades.

References

External links
Langenstein's website
Langenstein’s Celebrates its 100 Years as Part of the New Orleans Community

Supermarkets of the United States
American companies established in 1922
Retail companies established in 1922
Food and drink companies of New Orleans